Kilskeer or Kilskyre is a townland and small village in County Meath, Ireland,  southwest of the town of Kells.

It is the birthplace of Brian O'Higgins, the revolutionary and poet who was president of Sinn Féin in the 1930s. Jim Connell, the political activist and writer of the socialist anthem "The Red Flag", was born in the nearby townland of Rathniska.

See also
 List of towns and villages in Ireland

References

Towns and villages in County Meath